Gabriella Wood (born 4 September 1997) is an Trinidadian international level judoka. She competed at the 2020 Summer Olympics in the 78 kg class.

She participated at the 2021 World Judo Championships.
She is the first woman from Trinidad and Tobago to qualify for Judo in the Olympics, representing Trinidad and Tobago in the Tokyo 2020 Summer Olympic Games.

She attended St. Joseph's Convent Port of Spain, in Port of Spain, Trinidad.

References

External links
 
 

1997 births
Living people
Judoka at the 2019 Pan American Games
Judoka at the 2020 Summer Olympics
Olympic judoka of Trinidad and Tobago
Pan American Games competitors for Trinidad and Tobago
Trinidad and Tobago female judoka